Dragon is an adventure novel by Clive Cussler.  This is the 10th book featuring the author's primary protagonist, Dirk Pitt. In 1945, a B-29 bomber carrying a third atomic bomb to Japan is shot down over the sea off the coast of Japan. In 1993, terrorists want to restore Japan's former glory through nuclear blackmail.

Characters in Dragon
Dirk Pitt – Special Projects Director for the National Underwater and Marine Agency (NUMA)
Admiral James Sandecker – Chief Director of NUMA
Al Giordino – Assistant Special Projects Director for NUMA.
Hideki Suma - The Japanese leader to the "Kaiten Project", he plans to blackmail the world powers into treating Japan as the leading world power by secretly planting nuclear bomb cars inside the major cities of the world. 
Major Charles Dennings - Dennings Demons, Pilot
Captain Irv Stanton - Dennings Demons, Bombardier 
Captain Mort Stromp - Dennings Demons, Co-Pilot
Lieutenant Joseph Arnold - Dennings Demons, Navigator
Navy Commander Hank Byrnes - Dennings Demons, Weapons Engineer
General Harold Morrison - Special deputy to General Leslie Groves
General Leslie Groves - Head of the Manhattan Project
Sergeant Robert Mosley - Dennings Demons, Flight Engineer
Lieutenant Junior Grade Sato Okinaga - Japanese Patrol Pilot
Captain Arne Korvold - Captain, Narvik
Oscar Steen - Chief Officer, Narvik
Olaf Andersson - Asst. Chief Engineer, Narvik, Divine Star Boarding Party
Clive Cussler – This was the first novel in which the author made a cameo appearance.

Release Details
1990, United States, Simon & Schuster , 1990, Hardcover.
1991, United States, Pocket Books (Revised Edition), July 1, 1991, Paperback.
1993, United States, LGF, January 1, 1993, Paperback.

1990 American novels
American thriller novels
Dirk Pitt novels
Fiction set in 1993
Books with cover art by Paul Bacon